Sapria ram is a holoparasitic flowering plant endemic to Thailand. It is found in central and southern Thailand. H. Bänziger & B. Hansen (1997) consider specimens in Thailand formerly identified as Sapria poilanei (currently considered to be endemic to Cambodia) to be Sapria ram.

References

Endemic flora of Thailand
Parasitic plants
Rafflesiaceae